Crispatotrochus is a genus of cnidarians belonging to the family Caryophylliidae.

The genus has cosmopolitan distribution.

Species

Species:

Crispatotrochus antarcticus 
Crispatotrochus avis 
Crispatotrochus cornu

References

Caryophylliidae
Scleractinia genera